Shyama Surgical Sansthan is a well-known hospital in city of Kathalwari, Darbhanga in the state of Bihar. Operating from year 2001 it is one of the leading healthcare provider in Darbhanga.

References

External links
Official website

Hospitals in Bihar
Year of establishment missing
Darbhanga